Hameed is a village in the Chach Valley of Hazro Tehsil in Attock District of Punjab Province, Pakistan.

History

Liaka Kusulaka was an Indo-Scythian satrap of the area of Chukhsa (Chach) during the 1st century BCE.

The Battle of Chach was fought in 1008 AD between the Ghaznavid army of Sultan Mahmud of Ghazni and the Hindu Shahi army of Anandapala, resulting in the latter's defeat.

Geography
Hameed is located in western Chhachh, about 4 km from the city of Hazro. Hameed has its own union council, which also governs other surrounding villages.

References
 

Villages in Attock District